Damned If I Do

"Damned If I Do", song from Eve (The Alan Parsons Project album)
"Damned If I Do", song from Emancipation (Prince album)
"Damned If I Do", song from film A Thin Line Between Love and Hate